In Norse mythology,  is a series of events, including a great battle, foretelling the death of numerous great figures (including the gods Odin, Thor, Týr, Freyr, Heimdall, and Loki), natural disasters, and the submersion of the world in water. After these events, the world will rise again, cleansed and fertile, the surviving and returning gods will meet and the world will be repopulated by two human survivors.  is an important event in Norse mythology and has been the subject of scholarly discourse and theory in the history of Germanic studies.

The event is attested primarily in the Poetic Edda, compiled in the 13th century from earlier traditional sources, and the Prose Edda, written in the 13th century by Snorri Sturluson.

Etymology
The Old Norse compound word  has a long history of interpretation. "the ruling powers, gods." The plural noun  has several meanings, including "development, origin, cause, relation, fate." The word  as a whole is then usually interpreted as the "final destiny of the gods."

The singular form  is found in a stanza of the Poetic Edda poem Lokasenna, and in the Prose Edda. The noun  means "twilight" (from the verb  "to grow dark"), suggesting a translation "twilight of the gods."
(nevertheless giving rise to the calque  "Twilight of the Gods" in the German reception of Norse mythology).

Presence in literature

Poetic Edda
The Poetic Edda contains various references to :

In the Poetic Edda poem , references to  begin from stanza 40 until 58, with the rest of the poem describing the aftermath. In stanza 41, the  says:

The  then describes three roosters crowing: In stanza 42, the  herdsman Eggthér sits on a mound and cheerfully plays his harp while the crimson rooster Fjalar (Old Norse "hider, deceiver") crows in the forest Gálgviðr. The golden rooster Gullinkambi crows to the Æsir in Valhalla, and the third, unnamed soot-red rooster crows in the halls of the underworld location of Hel in stanza 43.

After these stanzas, the  further relates that the hound Garmr produces deep howls in front of the cave of Gnipahellir. Garmr's bindings break and he runs free. The  describes the state of humanity:

The "sons of Mím" are described as being "at play," though this reference is not further explained in surviving sources. Heimdall raises the Gjallarhorn into the air and blows deeply into it, and Odin converses with Mím's head. The world tree Yggdrasil shudders and groans. The  Hrym comes from the east, his shield before him. The Midgard serpent Jörmungandr furiously writhes, causing waves to crash. "The eagle shrieks, pale-beaked he tears the corpse," and the ship Naglfar breaks free thanks to the waves made by Jormungandr and sets sail from the east. The fire  inhabitants of Muspelheim come forth.

The dwarfs groan by their stone doors. Surtr advances from the south, his sword brighter than the sun. Rocky cliffs open and the  women sink.

The gods then do battle with the invaders: Odin is swallowed whole and alive fighting the wolf Fenrir, causing his wife Frigg her second great sorrow (the first being the death of her son, the god Baldr). Odin's son Víðarr avenges his father by rending Fenrir's jaws apart and stabbing it in the heart with his spear, thus killing the wolf. The serpent Jörmungandr opens its gaping maw, yawning widely in the air, and is met in combat by Thor. Thor, also a son of Odin and described here as protector of the earth, furiously fights the serpent, defeating it, but Thor is only able to take nine steps afterwards before collapsing dead from the Serpent's venom. The god Freyr fights Surtr and loses. After this, people flee their homes, and the sun becomes black while the earth sinks into the sea, the stars vanish, steam rises, and flames touch the heavens.

The  sees the earth reappearing from the water and an eagle over a waterfall hunting fish on a mountain. The surviving Æsir meet together at the field of Iðavöllr. They discuss Jörmungandr, great events of the past, and the runic alphabet. In stanza 61, in the grass, they find the golden game pieces that the gods are described as having once happily enjoyed playing games with long ago (attested earlier in the same poem). The reemerged fields grow without needing to be sown. The gods Höðr and Baldr return from Hel and live happily together.

The  says that the god Hœnir chooses wooden slips for divination and that the sons of two brothers will widely inhabit the windy world. She sees a hall thatched with gold in Gimlé, where nobility will live and spend their lives pleasurably. Stanzas 65, found in the  version of the poem, refers to a "powerful, mighty one" that "rules over everything" and who will arrive from above at the court of the gods (Old Norse ), which has been interpreted as a Christian addition to the poem. In stanza 66, the  ends her account with a description of the dragon Níðhöggr, corpses in his jaws, flying through the air. The  then "sinks down."

In the poem, Odin, disguised as Gagnráðr, faces off with the wise  Vafþrúðnir in a battle of wits. Vafþrúðnismál references Njörðr's status as a hostage during the earlier Æsir–Vanir War, and that he will "come back home among the wise Vanir" at "the doom of men."

In stanza 44, Odin poses the question to Vafþrúðnir as to who of mankind will survive the "famous"  ("Mighty Winter"). In stanza 46, Odin asks what sun will come into the sky after Fenrir has consumed the sun that exists. Vafþrúðnir responds that Sól will bear a daughter before Fenrir assails her and that after  this daughter will continue her mother's path.

In stanza 51, Vafþrúðnir states that, after Surtr's flames have been sated, Odin's sons Víðarr and Váli will live in the temples of the gods, and that Thor's sons Móði and Magni will possess the hammer Mjolnir. In stanza 52, the disguised Odin asks the  about his fate. Vafþrúðnir responds that "the wolf" will consume Odin, and that Víðarr will avenge him by sundering its cold jaws in battle. Odin ends the duel with one final question: what did Odin say to his son before preparing his funeral pyre? With this, Vafþrúðnir realizes that he is dealing with none other than Odin, whom he refers to as "the wisest of beings," adding that Odin alone could know this. Odin's message has been interpreted as a promise of resurrection to Baldr after .

is briefly referenced in stanza 40 of the poem . Here, the valkyrie Sigrún's unnamed maid is passing the deceased hero Helgi Hundingsbane's burial mound. Helgi is there with a retinue of men, surprising the maid. The maid asks if she is witnessing a delusion since she sees dead men riding, or if  has occurred. In stanza 41, Helgi responds that it is neither.

Prose Edda

Gylfaginning chapters 26 and 34

In chapter 34, High describes the binding of the wolf Fenrir by the gods, causing the god Týr to lose his right hand, and that Fenrir remains there until . Gangleri asks High why, since the gods could only expect destruction from Fenrir, they did not simply kill Fenrir once he was bound. High responds that "the gods hold their sacred places and sanctuaries in such respect that they chose not to defile them with the wolf's blood, even though the prophecies foretold that he would be the death of Odin."

As a consequence of his role in the death of the god Baldr, Loki (described as father of Fenrir) is bound on top of three stones with the internal organs of his son Narfi (which are turned into iron) in three places. There, venom drops onto his face periodically from a snake placed by the  Skaði. Loki's wife Sigyn collects the venom into a bucket, but whenever she leaves to empty it, the drops reach Loki's face, and the pain he experiences causes convulsions, resulting in earthquakes.

chapter 51

In Chapter 51, High states that the first sign of  will be , during which time three winters will arrive without a summer, and the sun will be useless. High details that, before these winters, three earlier winters will have occurred, marked with great battles throughout the world. During this time, greed will cause brothers to kill brothers, and fathers and sons will suffer from the collapse of kinship bonds. Next, High describes that the wolf will swallow the sun, then his brother will swallow the moon, and mankind will consider the occurrence as a great disaster resulting in much ruin. The stars will disappear. The earth and mountains will shake so violently that the trees will come loose from the soil, the mountains will topple, and all restraints will break, causing Fenrir to break free from his bonds.

High relates that the great serpent Jörmungandr, also described as a child of Loki in the same source, will breach land as the sea violently swells onto it. The ship Naglfar, described in the Prose Edda as being made from the human nails of the dead, is released from its mooring and sets sail on the surging sea, steered by a  named Hrym. At the same time, Fenrir, eyes and nostrils spraying flames, charges forward with his mouth wide open, his upper jaw reaching to the heavens, and his lower jaw touching the earth. At Fenrir's side, Jörmungandr sprays venom throughout the air and the sea.

During all of this, the sky splits into two. From the split, the "sons of Muspell" ride forth. Surtr rides first, surrounded by flames, his sword brighter than the sun. The sons of Muspell (and their shining battle troop) advance to the field of Vígríðr, described as an expanse that reaches "a hundred leagues in each direction," where Fenrir, Jörmungandr, Loki (followed by "Hel's own"), and Hrym (accompanied by all frost ) join them. While this occurs, Heimdallr stands and blows the Gjallarhorn with all his might. The gods awaken at the sound, and they meet. Odin rides to Mímisbrunnr in search of counsel from Mímir. Yggdrasil shakes, and everything, everywhere fears.

High relates that the Æsir and the Einherjar dress for war and head to the field. Odin, wearing a gold helmet and an intricate coat of mail, carries his spear Gungnir and rides before them. Odin advances against Fenrir, while Thor moves at his side, though Thor is unable to assist Odin because he has engaged Jörmungandr in combat. According to High, Freyr fights fiercely with Surtr, but falls because he lacks the sword he once gave to his messenger, Skírnir. The hound Garmr (described here as the "worst of monsters") breaks free from his bonds in front of Gnipahellir, and fights the god Týr, resulting in both of their deaths.

Thor kills Jörmungandr but is poisoned by the serpent, and manages to walk only nine steps before falling to the earth dead. Fenrir swallows Odin, though immediately afterwards his son Víðarr kicks his foot into Fenrir's lower jaw, grips the upper jaw, and rips apart Fenrir's mouth, killing the great wolf. Loki fights Heimdallr and the two kill each other. Surtr covers the earth in fire, causing the entire world to burn.

Gylfaginning chapters 52 and 53
At the beginning of chapter 52, Gangleri asks "what will be after heaven and earth and the whole world are burned? All the gods will be dead, together with the Einherjar and the whole of mankind. Didn't you say earlier that each person will live in some world throughout all ages?"

The figure of Third, seated on the highest throne in the hall, responds that there will be many good places to live, but also many bad ones. Third states that the best place to be is Gimlé in the heavens, where a place exists called Okolnir that houses a hall called Brimir—where one can find plenty to drink. Third describes a hall made of red gold located in Niðafjöll called Sindri, where "good and virtuous men will live." Third further relates an unnamed hall in Náströnd, the beaches of the dead, that he describes as a large repugnant hall facing north that is built from the spines of snakes, and resembles "a house with walls woven from branches"; the heads of the snakes face the inside of the house and spew so much venom that rivers of it flow throughout the hall, in which oath breakers and murderers must wade.

Chapter 53 begins with Gangleri asking if any of the gods will survive and if there will be anything left of the earth or the sky. High responds that the earth will appear once more from the sea, beautiful and green, where self-sown crops grow. The field Iðavöllr exists where Asgard once was, and, there, untouched by Surtr's flames, Víðarr and Váli reside. Now possessing their father's hammer Mjölnir, Thor's sons Móði and Magni will meet them there, and, coming from Hel, Baldr and Höðr also arrive. Together, they all sit and recount memories, later finding the gold game pieces the Æsir once owned.  stanza 51 is then quoted.

High reveals that two humans, Líf and Lífþrasir, will have also survived the destruction by hiding in the wood Hoddmímis holt. These two survivors consume the morning dew for sustenance, and from their descendants, the world will be repopulated.  stanza 45 is then quoted.

Archaeological record

Thorwald's Cross
Thorwald's Cross, a partially surviving runestone erected at Kirk Andreas on the Isle of Man, depicts a bearded human holding a spear downward at a wolf, his right foot in its mouth, while a large bird sits at his shoulder. Rundata dates it to 940, while Pluskowski dates it to the 11th century. On the other side of the stone is a depiction of a large cross and another image parallel to the Odin figure that has been described as Christ triumphing over Satan. These combined elements have led to the cross as being described as "syncretic art," a mixture of pagan and Christian beliefs.

Gosforth Cross
The Gosforth Cross (920–950), in Cumbria, England, is a standing cross of a typical Anglo-Saxon form, carved on all sides of the long shaft, which is nearly square in section. Apart from panels of ornament, the scenes include a Christian crucifixion, and possibly another scene in Hell, but the other scenes are generally interpreted as narrative incidents from the  story, even by a scholar as cautious of such interpretations as David M. Wilson. The  battle itself may be depicted on the north side. The cross features various figures depicted in Borre style, including a man with a spear facing a monstrous head, with one foot thrust into the beast's forked tongue and on its lower jaw, and the other is against its upper jaw, a scene interpreted as Víðarr fighting Fenrir.

Ledberg stone

Below the beast and the man is a depiction of a legless, helmeted man, with his arms in a prostrate position. The Younger Futhark inscription on the stone bears a commonly seen memorial dedication, but is followed by an encoded runic sequence that has been described as "mysterious," and "an interesting magic formula which is known from all over the ancient Norse world."

Skarpåker stone
On the early 11th-century Skarpåker Stone, from Södermanland, Sweden, a father grieving his dead son used the same verse form, as in the Poetic Edda in the following engraving:

Theories and interpretations

Cyclic time and Hoddmímis holt
Simek says that Hoddmímis holt "should not be understood literally as a wood or even a forest in which the two keep themselves hidden, but rather as an alternative name for the world-tree Yggdrasill. Simek says that in Germanic regions, the concept of mankind originating from trees is ancient, and additionally points out legendary parallels in a Bavarian legend of a shepherd who lives inside a tree, whose descendants repopulate the land after life there has been wiped out by plague (citing a retelling by F. R. Schröder). In addition, Simek points to an Old Norse parallel in the figure of Örvar-Oddr, "who is rejuvenated after living as a tree-man (Ǫrvar-Odds saga 24–27)."

In both sources, the word is used to signify the end of the world through fire.

Proto-Indo-European basis
Subsequently, theories have been put forth that  represents a later evolution of a Proto-Indo-European belief along with other cultures descending from the Proto-Indo-Europeans. Víðarr's stride has been compared to the Vedic god Vishnu in that both have a "cosmic stride" with a special shoe used to tear apart a beastly wolf. Larger patterns have also been drawn between "final battle" events in Indo-European cultures, including the occurrence of a blind or semi-blind figure in "final battle" themes, and figures appearing suddenly with surprising skills.

Volcanic eruptions
Hilda Ellis Davidson theorizes that the events in  occurring after the death of the gods (the sun turning black, steam rising, flames touching the heavens, etc.) may be inspired by the volcanic eruptions on Iceland. Bertha Phillpotts theorizes that the figure of Surtr was inspired by Icelandic eruptions and that he was a volcano demon. Surtr's name occurs in some Icelandic place names, among them the lava tube Surtshellir, a number of dark caverns in the volcanic central region of Iceland.

Parallels have been pointed out between a poem spoken by a  found in the 13th-century   ("the tale of the mountain dweller"). In the tale, Thórd and his servant get lost while travelling to church in winter, and so take shelter for the night within a cave. Inside the cave they hear noises, witness a pair of immense burning eyes, and then the being with burning eyes recites a poem of 12 stanzas. The poem the being recites contains references to Norse mythology (including a mention of Thor) and also prophecies (including that "mountains will tumble, the earth will move, men will be scoured by hot water and burned by fire"). Surtr's fire receives a mention in stanza 10. John Lindow says that the poem may describe "a mix of the destruction of the race of giants and of humans, as in " but that "many of the predictions of disruption on earth could also fit the volcanic activity that is so common in Iceland."

Modern influences
The events of Ragnarok are dramatized, albeit briefly, in Hans Christian Andersen's fairy tale "The Marsh King's Daughter".

In late 2013 and early 2014, English-language media outlets widely reported that  was foretold to occur on 22 February 2014. Apparently patterned after the 2012 phenomenon, the claim was at times attributed to a "Viking Calendar". No such calendar is known to have existed, and the source was a "prediction" made to media outlets by the Jorvik Viking Centre in York, England, intended to draw attention to an event that the institution was to hold on that date. The Jorvik Viking Centre was criticized for misleading the public to promote the event. In a 2014 article on the claims, philologist Joseph S. Hopkins perceives the media response as an example of a broad revival of interest in the Viking Age and ancient Germanic topics.

The Norwegian film Gåten Ragnarok was released in 2013 and centres on the discovery of the mythical serpent in contemporary Finnmark.

A. S. Byatt published a novel entitled Ragnarok: The End of the Gods in 2011.

Ragnarök is set up at the end of the 2018 video game God of War, which is rooted in Norse mythology, after the protagonist Kratos kills Baldr. The 2022 sequel, God of War Ragnarök, deals with the aftermath of this event and covers the in-game version of Ragnarök.

Norse mythology and climate change inspired the eponymous TV series Ragnarok. They are challenged by a teenage boy, Magne, the reincarnation of Thor. Thus begins the event Ragnarok ("twilight of the gods"), the fight against those who are destroying the planet.

In the 2020 video game Assassin's Creed Valhalla, which is partially inspired by Norse mythology, the Æsir are depicted as members of the Isu, who within the series' fictional lore, are an advanced civilization that predate humanity, and Ragnarök refers to a series of events revolving around the Toba Catastrophe, or the "Great Catastrophe", which was a solar flare that hit the Earth, killing most of the Isu. In one of the game's story arcs, the protagonist Eivor assumes the role of Odin (later revealed to be her previous life), who searches for a way for himself and the other Æsir to survive beyond Ragnarök, during which they are all foretold to perish. One of the game's downloadable content packs, titled Dawn of Ragnarök, builds upon this, as it follows Odin just as the events of Ragnarök are about to begin.

Citations

General references

 
 
 
 
 
 
 
 
 
 
 
 
 
 
 
 
 
 
 Rundata 2.0 for Windows.

External links
 
 
 

Apocalypticism
Death of deities
Eschatology in Norse mythology
Events in Norse mythology
War in mythology